Anophthalmus schmidti is a species of ground beetle endemic to Europe. It is found in Croatia, mainland Italy, and Slovenia. It lives in caves.

References

External links

Trechinae
Beetles of Europe
Cave beetles
Beetles described in 1844